Song Without End, subtitled The Story of Franz Liszt, is a 1960 biographical film romance made by Columbia Pictures. It was directed by Charles Vidor, who died during the shooting of the film and was replaced by George Cukor. It was produced by William Goetz from a screenplay by Oscar Millard, revised (uncredited) by Walter Bernstein and based on screenwriter Oscar Saul's original 1952 script (uncredited).<ref name="Turner Classic Movies Website">Turner Classic Movies Website, accessed March 31, 2009</ref> The music score was by Morris Stoloff and Harry Sukman with music by Franz Liszt, and the cinematography by James Wong Howe and Charles Lang (uncredited). The film also features music of those contemporaries of Liszt whom he unselfishly championed by featuring them in his numerous performances (e.g., Richard Wagner, Hector Berlioz, among others).

The film stars Dirk Bogarde as Liszt, Capucine (in her acting debut) as Princess Carolyne zu Sayn-Wittgenstein, and Geneviève Page as Marie d'Agoult, with Patricia Morison as George Sand, Alexander Davion as Frédéric Chopin, Lyndon Brook as Richard Wagner, Albert Rueprecht as Prince Felix Lichnowsky, Erland Erlandsen as Sigismond Thalberg, Ivan Desny, Martita Hunt, Lou Jacobi, and Marcel Dalio.

Background
Columbia Pictures had plans to film The Franz Liszt Story back in 1952. Studio head Harry Cohn hired his friend, acclaimed screenwriter Oscar Saul (A Streetcar Named Desire), to produce his own original screenplay with William Dieterle set to direct. When the studio delayed going forward with the project due to production and casting issues for three years, Oscar Saul backed out, and Columbia announced in 1955 that Gottfried Reinhardt had been commissioned to write a new screenplay. In 1958, veteran producer William Goetz took over the project with Oscar Millard as his screenwriter. Charles Vidor, who previously directed A Song to Remember (1945), a biopic of Frédéric Chopin, was assigned to direct using elements of all three screenwriters' scripts.

As nearly 40 musical selections were heard in the film, Morris Stoloff, head of Columbia's music department, began immediate work on the soundtrack. After selecting the pieces to be played, he engaged piano virtuoso Jorge Bolet, the Roger Wagner Chorale and the Los Angeles Philharmonic to perform the score. Harry Sukman was in charge of the music editing and adaptations that were required for the musical score. Musicologist Abram Chasins was a musical consultant on the film. The recording of the music (by Earl Mounce) was completed before the start of production so that Bogarde could learn the finger movements necessary to make him appear to be playing the piano realistically in the film. Musical adviser Victor Aller spent three weeks rehearsing Bogarde in proper piano technique.

As for the image of the composer, the filmmakers made Dirk Bogarde look more like Elvis Presley, sticking not to historical accuracy, but to popular trends of the late 1950s.

Cast
 Dirk Bogarde as Franz Liszt
 Capucine as Princess Carolyne Wittgenstein
 Geneviève Page as Countess Marie D'Agoult
 Patricia Morison as Georges Sand
 Ivan Desny as Prince Nicholas
 Martita Hunt as Grand Duchess
 Lou Jacobi as Potin
 Albert Rueprecht as Prince Felix Lichnowsky
 Marcel Dalio as Chelard
 Lyndon Brook as Richard Wagner
 Walter Rilla as Archbishop
 Hans Unterkircher as Czar
 Erland Erlandsen as Sigismond Thalberg (as E. Erlandsen)
 Alexander Davion as Frédéric Chopin (as Alex Davion)
 Katherine Squire as Anna Liszt

Soundtracks
Two notable soundtracks were recorded in 1960, one by each of the composers of the Oscar-winning score. Colpix Records, a division of Columbia Pictures released Song Without End: Original Soundtrack Recording featuring the pianist Jorge Bolet playing seven of Franz Liszt's compositions. The Los Angeles Philharmonic Orchestra was conducted by Morris Stoloff. Orchestral selections included four selections from the film's repertoire, and two selections reminded listeners of Liszt's organ virtuosity (uncredited performer..accompanied by "The Song Without End" chorus). CP-506 (LP). The Franz Liszt Story'' featured the piano and orchestra of Harry Sukman. Liberty Records, LST-7151 (LP). Harry Sukman recorded ten of the Liszt compositions featured in the film.
Eight of those selections were adaptations by Harry Sukman composed especially for the album.

Reception
New York Times critic Bosley Crowther praised the music: “A little bit of everything reflective not only of the talent of Liszt but also of most of the great composers of his highly romantic age—Wagner, Paganini, Beethoven, Verdi, Chopin—artists whose work he respected, assisted, embellished and often played, is packed into this picture. And it is brilliantly and beautifully performed...”  However, he observed that “the host of characters were brushed in so superficially that they carry little conviction or emotional strength, and the performances of the actors are, by necessity, more elaborate than they are deep... However, as we say, the music thunders; the settings and costumes are superb—such Viennese concert halls and palaces and lush romantic trappings have never been surpassed in a color film—and, indeed, the sheer posing of the actors by the late Charles Vidor and George Cukor is so suave that anyone moved by musical richness and pictorial splendor should go quite nutty over this film.”

Academy Awards
The film won the Best Music score Academy Award for Morris Stoloff and Harry Sukman and the Golden Globe Award for Best Motion Picture (Musical).

References

External links
 
 
 
 
 Article on the difficult history of the production (from the Turner Classic Movies website)

1960 films
1960s biographical drama films
American biographical drama films
Best Musical or Comedy Picture Golden Globe winners
Biographical films about musicians
Columbia Pictures films
CinemaScope films
Cultural depictions of Franz Liszt
Cultural depictions of Frédéric Chopin
Cultural depictions of George Sand
Cultural depictions of Richard Wagner
Films about classical music and musicians
Films about composers
Films about pianos and pianists
Films directed by Charles Vidor
Films directed by George Cukor
Films scored by Harry Sukman
Films scored by Morris Stoloff
Films set in France
Films set in Germany
Films set in Italy
Films set in Russia
Films set in the 19th century
Films shot in Austria
Films that won the Best Original Score Academy Award
1960 drama films
1960s English-language films
1960s American films